Lieutenant-Colonel Sir Eric Richard Thesiger DSO, TD (17 February 1874 – 2 October 1961), styled The Honourable from 1878, was a British soldier and page to Queen Victoria.

Background
Born in London in February 1874, Thesiger was the fourth son of Frederic Thesiger, 2nd Baron Chelmsford and his wife Adria Fanny Heath, daughter of Major-General John Coussamker Heath. His older brothers were Frederic Thesiger, 1st Viscount Chelmsford and the diplomat Wilfred Gilbert Thesiger. Thesiger was educated at Winchester College and in 1884, he was nominated Page of Honour to the Queen, a post he fulfilled for the following six years. In 1893, he became a Staff Commissioner of Police.

Career
Thesiger joined the Imperial Yeomanry as a private during the Second Boer War, when he was appointed a lieutenant of the 15th Battalion (Imperial Yeomanry) on 29 November 1900. On 1 November 1901 he was promoted to captain in the battalion, with the temporary rank of captain in the Army. He stayed in South Africa until the war ended in June 1902, left Port Elizabeth for Southampton on the SS Colombian the following month, and relinquished his commission in the Imperial Yeomanry on 3 September 1902, when he was granted the honorary rank of captain in the Army. In late 1902 he became a second lieutenant of the Surrey Yeomanry. He was transferred as major from the Yeomanry into the Territorial Force in 1908. In the First World War Thesiger was wounded twice and was mentioned in despatches as many times.

He was appointed to the 10th Battalion, Royal West Surrey Regiment in 1917, commanding it until 1918, and subsequently the 10th Battalion, Royal West Kent Regiment for another year. In March of the latter year, he was decorated with the Distinguished Service Order (DSO) and in August, he received the Territorial Decoration (TD). He was made an Officer of the Order of the Crown of Belgium and also awarded the Belgian Croix de guerre in October and some days later, he was promoted to lieutenant-colonel.

He retired from the Territorial Army in 1929, having reached the age limit.

Family
On 29 October 1904, he married firstly Pearl Marie Coupland, only daughter of John Coupland, and had by her a daughter and two sons. She died in 1922, and Thesiger remarried Sydney Hilda Hutton-Croft, daughter of George Arthur Hutton-Croft on 3 October 1929, but she died only a year later. He married thirdly Mary Pudsey, daughter of Reverend F. W. Pudsey, on 27 March 1953. His third wife sadly also died the next year, and Thesiger survived her until 1961.

References

External links

1874 births
1961 deaths
Military personnel from London
British Army personnel of the Second Boer War
British Army personnel of World War I
Imperial Yeomanry officers
Pages of Honour
People educated at Winchester College
Queen's Own Royal West Kent Regiment officers
Younger sons of barons

Companions of the Distinguished Service Order
Recipients of the Croix de Guerre (France)
Recipients of the Order of the Crown (Belgium)
Surrey Yeomanry officers
Eric